Sweet Sensation is a female freestyle-dance music trio from The Bronx, New York City. The group is composed of Betty LeBron, Margie Fernandez, Mari Fernandez, and Sheila Vega (who replaced Mari in 1989). The group was formed in 1986 and released albums until 1992. Their song "If Wishes Came True" is their biggest hit, topping the Billboard Hot 100 list for a week in 1990.

History
Sweet Sensation was originally formed in 1985. A suggestion by Margie Fernandez led Betty Lebron to meet with David Sanchez, who was co-managing a group called Sly Fox with Cherrie Shepherd. One afternoon, David came by to meet Betty at Margie's home in Manhattan with a boombox. He recorded Betty singing a capella and passed this recording on to Shepherd. A few weeks later, on March 15, 1985, Margie and Betty had a meeting at Intergalactic Studios with Shepherd. Coincidentally, the act recording in the studio that day was a rap group called The Boogie Boys. One of the members of the group, Joseph "Romeo J.D." Malloy, would later become one of Sweet Sensation's main songwriters, penning several songs on their debut album, Take It While It's Hot.

Romeo's first song after meeting Margie and Betty was a demo called "Could It Be", which was recorded in Romeo's home studio by Betty. It was re-recorded at Unique Recording in New York City with Ted Currier of Platinum Vibe Productions as producer. It was at this time that a new chorus was added, and the song was re-titled "Hooked on You." Once the song was finally completed, a girl group was formed. Margie and her sister Mari joined Betty in the group. Sweet Sensation was signed to a production deal with Platinum Vibe Productions, and recording started on their first album, with Betty Lebron on lead vocals. Using "Hooked on You" as an introduction, the trio was signed to Next Plateau Records. "Hooked on You" was released on the Next Plateau label, along with their second single, "Victim of Love (Goodbye Baby)." In 1987, they were picked up by Atco, and their debut album, Take It While It's Hot, was released.  The album peaked at #63 on the Billboard pop albums chart and spawned five singles: "Hooked on You" (#23), "Victim of Love (Goodbye Baby)," "Take It While It's Hot," "Never Let You Go" (which reached #1 on the U.S. Dance chart), and "Sincerely Yours" (#14).

In late 1988, Mari left the group and was replaced by Sheila Vega. The artwork of their debut album, a photograph of the trio, was updated to reflect this change. The original album cover featured Betty, Margie, and Mari, but in the 1989 re-pressing of their album, new member Sheila Vega replaced Mari on the cover. The vocals on the album weren't re-recorded after the personnel change, however. 

In 1990, their second album, Love Child, was released, containing what would turn out to be their biggest hit, the ballad "If Wishes Came True," which reached Number One on the Billboard Hot 100.

In 1991, a remix album was released, Time to Jam (The Remix Album), which turned out to be their last album. That year, Margie and Sheila left the group and were replaced by three new members—Belle, Maya, and Jenae, making them a quartet.  They performed as Sweet Sensation for the next few years until Betty LeBron embarked on a solo career.

In 2004, Sweet Sensation was ranked #391 in the Rock on the Net web site's "Top 500 Pop Artists of the Past 25 Years". In 2005, the dance single "My Body Tu Cuerpo," credited as Dynamix Presents Sweet Sensation, was released on Kult Records featuring Betty LeBron on lead vocals (billed as Betty Dee), and produced by Eddie Cumana and Beppe Savoni of Dynamix.
 
For a brief period, the previous members, Margie, Sheila, and Mari reunited to form their own version of Sweet Sensation without lead singer Betty Lebron after sisters Margie and Mari applied for—and then obtained—the trademark rights to the name Sweet Sensation. This led to a case before the trial and appeals board of the US Trademark Patent Office that later canceled the original trademark obtained by the Fernandez sisters, and gave the rights to Lebron and Shepherd after evidence showed that first use and current use rights belonged to Lebron. The group consisting of Margie, Mari, and Sheila disbanded after performing only a few shows. Today, Sweet Sensation is composed of Betty, Belle, and Jenae, and is currently performing throughout the United States. The Sweet Sensation catalog is currently owned by Atco/Atlantic Records.

Discography

Albums
 Take It While It's Hot (Atco/Atlantic Records, 1988) – US No. 63
 Love Child (Atco/Atlantic Records, 1990) – US No. 78
 Time to Jam (The Remix Album) (Atco/Atlantic Records, 1991)

Singles

See also
List of number-one hits (United States)
List of artists who reached number one on the Hot 100 (U.S.)
List of number-one dance hits (United States)
List of artists who reached number one on the U.S. Dance chart

References

 American rhythm and blues musical groups
American dance girl groups
 Musical groups established in 1986
 Musical groups disestablished in 1992
 Musical groups reestablished in 2005
 Musical groups disestablished in 2009
 American dance music groups
 American freestyle music groups
1986 establishments in New York City
Atco Records artists
Musical groups from the Bronx
musicrareobscure.blogspot.com